The OSCE Mission in Kosovo (OMiK) is a field mission of the Organization for Security and Co-operation in Europe operating in Kosovo. The mission was deployed in July 1999 to support the United Nations Interim Administration Mission in Kosovo (UNMIK) in the field of democratisation, institution building and human rights in Kosovo.

Mandate

The mandate of the mission was set out in OSCE Permanent Council Decision No. 305 of 1 July 1999. The mission forms one of the pillars of the United Nations Interim Administration Mission in Kosovo relating to democratisation, institution building and human rights. The core objectives as mandated were to establish a police school to train officers for a new Kosovo Police Service, to train members of the judiciary, to organise and monitor elections, to support the development civil society, non-governmental organisations and political parties, to establish an Ombudsman institution and to monitor and protect human rights.

Heads of Mission

The current Head of the mission is Michael Davenport.

Gallery

See also
European Union Rule of Law Mission in Kosovo

Notes

References

External links
OSCE Mission in Kosovo – Official Website
OSCE Mission in Kosovo on Facebook
OSCE Mission in Kosovo on Twitter